Kazakh Americans are Americans of full or partial Kazakh ancestry. Although in the 1960s the population of Kazakh origin in United States was estimated in 3,000 people, the Census 2000 puts the population size in less of 300 people. According to the American Community Survey in 2010-2012 there were more than 23,000 people born in Kazakhstan, but not all of them are of Kazakh ethnicity.

History
Kazakhs began to emigrate to the United States after World War II. Shortly after of the war, some Kazakh Soviet citizens, who were captured during World War II, after their liberation by Allied troops migrated to the United States.

Attention of Kazakh immigrants to the United States re-newed somewhere in the mid 1960s after the liberalization of immigration laws. In those years there were about 20 families of Kazakhs in United States.

Kazakh diaspora in the United States adds to its ranks through inter-ethnic marriages, and since the breakup of Soviet Union in 1991, has increased due to Diversity Immigrant Visa program, employment-based immigration channels for scientists and engineers, such as H-1B visa and EBGC, and international child adoption.

Demography
The Kazakhs form communities in places as Reston, Virginia.
The Kazakh Americans are observed as mono-ethnic and inter-ethnic marriages. The latter is characterized more for the older generation. Young people trying to find his life partner of the Kazakh media, thus preserving, their ethnic identity.

Organizations
Like many immigrant groups in the United States, the Kazakhs have their own associations. This section lists these organizations, which are known to be active.

 The Kazakh American Association, a non-profit organization established in Reston, Virginia and founded to respond to the social, cultural, educational and recreational needs of Kazakh people visiting the United States and to preserve and strengthen the heritage and culture of Kazakhs people in USA.
 The Kazakh Aul of the United States, a nonprofit organization that has members in the entire country and is dedicated to Kazakh cultural education and support of the Kazakh population in U.S. The aul runs a summer camp called Zhaliau Heritage Camp focused on bringing Kazakh culture into the lives of Kazakh adoptees in the U.S.. There they can make friends with other adoptees and meet Kazakh adults who serve as role models. The association is founded by Kazakhs and Americans. Kazakh Aul has been organizing annual summer camps for past several years.
 Kazakh Student Association at Indiana University, established in 1996.

Notable people
Ken Alibek – former Soviet physician, microbiologist and biological warfare expert
Sanzhar Sultanov – Kazakh-born film director, producer and screenwriter
Saule Omarova – Kazakh-born attorney and former nominee to serve as Comptroller of the Currency

See also
 Central Asians in the United States
 Kazakhstan–United States relations

References

External links 
 Kazakh Student Association: Home - Michigan State University

 
Central Asian American